Santa Monica Parish Church may refer to any of the following churches:
 Santa Monica Parish Church (Angat), Bulacan, Philippines
 Santa Monica Parish Church (Minalin), Pampanga, Philippines
 Santa Monica Parish Church (Sarrat), Ilocos Norte, Philippines
 Santa Monica Parish Church, also known as Panay Church, Capiz, Philippines